Yuny Pakhar (Yunı Paxar) is a rural locality (a selo) in Pervomaysky Selsoviet, Derbentsky District, Republic of Dagestan, Russia. The population was 475 as of 2010. There are 12 streets.

Geography 
Yuny Pakhar is located 23 km northwest of Derbent (the district's administrative centre) by road. Duzlak and Imeni Michurina are the nearest rural localities.

Nationalities 
Dargins, Azerbaijanis and Tabasarans live there.

References 

Rural localities in Derbentsky District